Vladimír Dolejš (born September 7, 1955) is a Czechoslovak sprint canoer who competed in the late 1970s and early 1980s. He was eliminated in the semifinals of the K-4 1000 m event at the 1976 Summer Olympics in Montreal. Four years later in Moscow, Dolejš was eliminated in the semifinals of both the K-2 500 m and the K-2 1000 m event.

References
Sports-Reference.com profile

1955 births
Canoeists at the 1976 Summer Olympics
Canoeists at the 1980 Summer Olympics
Czechoslovak male canoeists
Living people
Olympic canoeists of Czechoslovakia